Nari (also Romanized as Nārī; also known as Khārī) is a village in Margavar Rural District, Silvaneh District, Urmia County, West Azerbaijan Province, Iran. At the 2006 census, its population was 308, in 57 families.

References 

Populated places in Urmia County